Max Liebster (15 February 1915 – 28 May 2008) was a German-born victim of Nazi persecution during World War II due to his Jewish race and religion. During his imprisonment in four concentration camps (Sachsenhausen, Neuengamme, Auschwitz, Buchenwald) he studied the Bible with fellow inmates that were Jehovah’s Witnesses and converted to their religion, baptized in a bathtub at Buchenwald. Liebster is also notable as the author of the book Crucible of Terror: A Story of Survival Through the Nazi Storm.

Family 
Liebster was born to Beirech “Bernhard” Liebster and Bertha Oppenheimer in Reichenbach, a part of Lautertal (Odenwald). In 1947, Liebster emigrated to America and petitioned to become an American Citizen in 1953. In 1956, he married Simone Arnold, another survivor of Nazi persecution.

References

External links 

 Arnold Liebster Foundation
 
 Max Liebster at United States Holocaust Memorial Museum

German Jehovah's Witnesses
1915 births
2008 deaths
Sachsenhausen concentration camp survivors
Neuengamme concentration camp survivors
Auschwitz concentration camp survivors
Buchenwald concentration camp survivors